The Dartmouth College Ski Team is organized under the aegis of the Dartmouth Outing Club and is notable for both providing students access to competitive skiing and training internationally successful nordic and alpine ski racers..  The Dartmouth Outing Club hosted the US's first downhill ski race on Mt Moosilauke in 1927, and Dartmouth skiing has been intertwined with ski racing ever since.

The alpine teams train at the Dartmouth Skiway in Lyme, New Hampshire. The nordic teams train at The Dartmouth Cross Country Ski Center at Oak Hill, Hanover NH.

Cami Thompson Graves is the Director of Skiing at Dartmouth and has been a Dartmouth coach since 1989; she was a US Ski Team member from 1985-1987, and is a member of the  US Ski & Snowboard Board of Directors.

History
Dartmouth College student Fred Harris (1888-1961) founded the Dartmouth Outing Club in 1909, and so became "the man who put America on skis"

The Nashua (NH) Telegraph notes that in 1914, a group of Dartmouth students travelled to Canada to compete against McGill University in the first collegiate ski race.  The Dartmouth Outing Club's 1927 race on Mt Moosilauke is cited by the US Ski & Snowboard Association as the first downhill ski race in the country.

By 1935 the ski team was sufficiently distinct from the Outing Club to have its own distinct captain; the first ″ski team″ captain was Selden Hannah D35, though there were ″winter sports″ captains before that.

The Dartmouth Ski Team won the  NCAA national championship in 1958, 1976 (tied with Colorado), and 2007.  The team finished in second place in 1955, 1956, 1964, 1969, and 1970.

Winter Olympic and Paralympic Games
Dartmouth skiers have represented the US (and other nations) in the winter Olympic and Paralympic Games.

World Cup
The highest level of competitive ski racing takes place on the  Alpine and  Nordic World Cup circuits.

Moosilauke Time Trial
Two times each year, the alpine and nordic ski teams complete a time trial, starting at the Moosilauke Ravine Lodge and ending at the summit of  Mt Moosilauke.

The course follows the Gorge Brook Trail, and ascends 2387 feet (to 4802 feet ASL) across 3.6 miles.  The course record of 36:16 was set in 2010 by Kris Freeman.

Dartmouth Ski Team alumni notable for accomplishments other than Olympic Skiing
 Katie Bono D10. Holder of women’s record for fastest ascent of Denali in Alaska, with a time of 21:06, set in 2017.
Bill Briggs D54. Pioneer of big mountain skiing, inducted into the U.S. National Ski and Snowboard Hall of Fame in 2008. 
 Howard Chivers D39.  Inducted into the US Ski and Snowboard Hall of Fame in 1973. 1942 National Nordic Combined Champion.  Former captain of the Dartmouth Ski Team. Brother of Warren Chivers.
  Tom Corcoran D54.  In addition to his Olympic performance and national championships, Corcoran founded  Waterville Valley ski area in New Hampshire. According to his entry in the National Ski Hall of Fame, "Tom Corcoran was elected to the U.S. National Ski Hall of Fame on 1978 as both a Skisport Builder and Ski Athlete. He received the Blegen Award in 1991, the highest award of the U.S. Ski Association. In 1995, he was elected to the Rolex International Ski Racing Hall of Fame."
 Peter Dodge D78. Dartmouth men's alpine coach. 1989-2022  Dodge raced on the US Pro Tour in the 1980s and was twice awarded skier of the year honors.   He is credited as instrumental in the increased relevance of collegiate skiing to the highest levels of the sport.
 Jack Durrance D36. Brother of ski team member Richard H. Durrance D39, attempted to climb K2 in 1939. He completed the first recorded traverse of the Grand, Middle and South Tetons in Wyoming (with Butterworth).  He completed the first recorded ascent of the Grand Teton via the northwest ridge (with M. Davis).  In 1936, he completed the first ascent of the north face of the Grand Teton (with Petzoldt and Petzoldt).
 Ned Gillette D67. In addition to attending the 1968 Winter Olympics, Gillette wrote a book on cross-country ski technique Cross-Country Skiing, first published in 1979. In 1981, Gillette climbed and descended by skiing the Pamir peak Mustag Ata (24,757 feet). Gillette was an adventurer, notably rowing 600 miles across the Drake Passage between South America and Antarctica.  He was killed in Kashmir in 1998 while traveling with Susan Patterson, his spouse.
 Fred H. Harris D1911. Founded the Dartmouth Outing Club; inducted into the US National Ski Hall of Fame in 1957.
 John McCrillis D1919. Early advocate for alpine (vs nordic) ski racing.  Inducted into the US National Ski Hall of Fame in 1966.
 Malcolm McLane D46. World War II fighter pilot, POW, Distinguished Flying Cross recipient. Rhodes Scholar, captain of the Dartmouth ski team, director of the US Olympic Committee. McLane was elected to the U.S. National Ski Hall of Fame in 1973.
 Walter Prager Coach; elected to the U.S. National Ski Hall of Fame in 1977.
 Gale Shaw III (Tiger) D85. CEO of  US Ski & Snowboard Association.
 Jeff Shiffrin D76. Father of Mikaela Shiffrin.
 Sandy Treat D46.  10th Mountain Division soldier during World War II. Inducted into the Colorado Snow Sports Hall of Fame in 2010.

Related topics
Dartmouth Outing Club alumni not associated with the ski team have made notable contributions to mountaineering.  For example, in 1963, Barry Bishop D53, Barry Corbet D58, Jake Breitenbach  D57, Barry Prather D61, and Dave Dingman D58 all joined the first US expedition to Mt Everest.

Margaret Wheeler D97 was president of the American Mountain Guides Association.

References

Further reading 
 Passion for Skiing: The Story of the Alumni, Staff and Family, How one Small College in New England, Dartmouth College, has been Dominating the Development of Modern Skiing for over 100 Years, Stephen L. Waterhouse, 2011 (ISBN 978-0975882016)
Reaching That Peak: 75 Years of the Dartmouth Outing Club, David O. Hooke, 1987 (ISBN 0-914659-24-3)

External links
 Dartmouth Sports Ski Team History
  Skiing History Peter Dodge and Rebirth of NCAA Racing
 Dartmouth Outing Club History of the DOC
 Dartmouth Alumni Magazine, How Does It Feel? Eighteen alumni athletes talk about their most memorable Olympic moments, 
 Dartmouth Alumni Magazine, 100 Years of the Outing Club

Dartmouth College
College skiing teams in the United States